245 Park Avenue is a 648-ft (198 m) skyscraper in New York City, New York.  It was completed in 1967, and contains  on 48 floors. Shreve, Lamb and Harmon designed the structure, which is the 94th-tallest building in New York. The Building Owners and Managers Association awarded the 2000/2001 Pinnacle Award to 245 Park Avenue. The building is assigned its own ZIP Code, 10167; it was one of 41 buildings in Manhattan that had their own ZIP Codes .

History
The site used to be occupied by the second Grand Central Palace exhibition hall, which was demolished in 1964 to make way for 245 Park Avenue. The building was previously named for American Tobacco Company, American Brands, and Bear Stearns at various points in its history.

In November 2000, JPMorgan Chase leased  in the building, creating a corporate campus with the company's nearby headquarters at 270 Park Avenue.

On March 20, 2017, Chinese conglomerate HNA Group announced a deal to acquire the building for $2.21 billion from Brookfield Property Partners and the New York State Teachers’ Retirement System, one of the highest prices ever paid for a New York skyscraper. HNA financed the acquisition with a $1.75 billion loan from a consortium of lenders including J.P. Morgan Chase, Deutsche Bank, Barclays, Natixis and Societe Generale in addition to $568 million of mezzanine financing. CBRE Group and Cooper-Horowitz made the deal for the loan, acting as commercial mortgage brokers.

Following financial difficulties at HNA in 2018, the conglomerate committed to selling off $22 billion in stocks and real estate assets. Part of this commitment included the sale of a $148 million stake in 245 Park Avenue to office REIT SL Green, which was also appointed as property manager and leasing manager.

Tenants
Angelo, Gordon & Co.,  on floors 24-26
Ares Management,  on floors 42-44
HNA Group,  on floor 40
Houlihan Lokey,  on floors 17, 19-20 & 32
JLL,  on floor 16
J.P. Morgan Chase,  on floors 2 & 16
Major League Baseball,  on floors 29-31 & 34
National Australia Bank,  on floor 28
Norinchukin Bank,  on floor 21
Pioneer Financial LLC,  on floor 17
Regus,  on floor 39
Rabobank,  on floors 36-38
SEB,  on floor 33
Societe Generale,  on floors 3-14
MIO Partners on floor 13
Vestar Capital Partners,  on floor 41
WisdomTree Investments,  on floor 35
Woori Bank,  on floor 43

See also
List of tallest buildings in New York City

References

External links
Emporis
Skyscraperpage

Office buildings completed in 1967
Skyscraper office buildings in Manhattan
JPMorgan Chase buildings
Park Avenue
Midtown Manhattan
Brookfield Properties buildings
1967 establishments in New York City